The Oetker Hotel Management GmbH, which also appears under the brand name Oetker Collection (OHC), is a German luxury hotel management company based in Baden-Baden.  The Oetker Collection is managed by the Oetker family. Company hospitality business first started in 1870 when Villa Soleil in Cap d'Antibes  opened as a writers' retreat and later become the celebrated Hotel du Cap-Eden-Roc.

History 
After success of Villa Soleil in Cap d'Antibes Brenners Park-Hotel & Spa in Baden-Baden happened to be the first "real" hotel operated by August Oetker family. Gradually more hotels were added. So the Hotel Le Bristol in Paris, the Château Saint-Martin & Spa in Vence and the Hôtel du Cap-Eden-Roc in Cap d'Antibes. In 2008 under leadership of young CEO Frank Marrenbach company started ambitious expansion.

Management
The Oetker Collection is managed by the Oetker family.
The company runs a number of hotels and country estates under the brand Oetker Collection. The portfolio is currently:
 L'Apogée Courchevel in Courchevel, France — situated in the French Alps.
 Brenners Park-Hotel & Spa in Baden-Baden, Germany.
 Hôtel Le Bristol Paris, France — located on the Rue Faubourg Saint Honoré.
 Château Saint-Martin & Spa in Vence, France —  between Nice and Antibes.
 Hôtel du Cap-Eden-Roc, Cap d'Antibes, France — a hotel in Cap d'Antibes, on the French Riviera.
 Eden Rock - St Barths in Saint Barthélemy.
 The Lanesborough in London.
 Palácio Tangará in São Paulo, Brazil.
 Jumby Bay Island resort in Antigua
The Woodward in Geneva
Hotel La Palma in Capri (Opening 2023)
Oetker Collection portfolio also features some Private Villas and Residences.

See also 
Dr. Oetker

References 

 
Hotel chains
Luxury hotels
Hospitality companies established in 1870
German companies established in 1870
Dr. Oetker